Albert F. Nasse (July 2, 1878 – November 21, 1910) was an American rower who competed in the 1904 Summer Olympics. In 1904 he was part of the American boat, which won the gold medal in the coxless four.

References

External links
 
 
 

1878 births
1910 deaths
American male rowers
Rowers at the 1904 Summer Olympics
Olympic gold medalists for the United States in rowing
Medalists at the 1904 Summer Olympics